Silafluofen is a fluorinated organosilicon pyrethroid insecticide.

Silafluofen is used agriculturally against soil-borne insects such as termites, and as a wood preservative. It is registered in Asia (India, Japan, Taiwan, Vietnam) since at least 1995 for crops such as drupes, tea and rice, but has not been notified or authorised in the European Union for example.

References

Pyrethroids
Organofluorides
Organosilicon compounds
Diphenyl ethers